The Anahuac National Wildlife Refuge (NWR) is a wildlife conservation area along the coast of Texas (USA), west of the town of High Island, Texas. It borders East Bay, part of the Galveston Bay complex, behind Bolivar Peninsula at the Gulf of Mexico.

Established in 1963, this wildlife refuge is located on the upper Texas Coast in Chambers County. The refuge offers opportunities for fishing, waterfowl hunting, paddling, and wildlife viewing. A large network of volunteers contributes thousands of hours in support of the refuge.

In the winter, the Anahuac National Wildlife Refuge hosts large concentrations of waterfowl making it a popular site for public hunting.

Other signature species are American alligator, bobcat, yellow rail, and purple gallinule.

Birdwatchers find the refuge an excellent place to observe neotropical migrants in the spring and fall. Other species sought by birdwatchers include American bittern, seaside sparrow, fulvous whistling-duck, and black rail.

Volunteers have been working to compile a butterfly list for the refuge. Over sixty species have been identified, including the extremely localized bay skipper (Euphyes bayensis).

Recent projects to enhance and restore the habitat at the refuge include control of invasive species like Chinese Tallow, prairie restoration, creation of moist soil areas, and a colonial waterbird rookery.

Three other national wildlife refuges on the Texas coast - Brazoria, San Bernard and Big Boggy - form a vital complex of coastal wetlands harboring more than 300 bird species.

Anahuac NWR is one of more than 560 refuges that comprise the U.S. National Wildlife Refuge System, a national network of lands and waters set aside for the benefit of wildlife. It has been designated as a site of international importance to shorebirds by the Western Hemisphere Shorebird Reserve Network (WHSRN).  The refuge is designated as part of the Great Texas Coastal Birding Trail, a network of trails and wildlife viewing sites established by the Texas Parks and Wildlife Department.

Gallery

See also
 Wildlife refuge

Notes

References

External links

 Friends of Anahuac Refuge.
 USFWS Anahuac National Wildlife Refuge.

National Wildlife Refuges in Texas
Galveston Bay Area
Protected areas of Chambers County, Texas
Wetlands of Texas
Landforms of Chambers County, Texas